The Miss Nicaragua 2004 pageant, was held on February 28, 2004 in Managua, after weeks of events.  At the conclusion of the final night of competition, Marifely Argüello César from Managua won the title. She represented Nicaragua at Miss Universe 2004 held in Ecuador later that year.  The rest of the finalists would enter different pageants.

Placements

.

Special awards

 Most Beautiful Face - La Libertad - Mariana Ortega
 Miss Photogenic - Managua - Marifely Argüello
 Miss Congeniality - Nueva Segovia - Daisy Jirón
 Best Hair - Matagalpa - María José Barrantes
 Miss Internet - Bluefields - Anasha Campbell  (by votes of Miss Nicaragua Webpage)

.

Official Contestants

Judges

 Dr. Steven B. Hopping - Director of Center for Cosmetic Surgery of  Washington, DC
 Mario Solano - Regional Manager of Copa Airlines
 Dra. Maria del Carmen Gonzalez - Ecuadorian Ambassador in Nicaragua
 Roberto Sanson - Regional Director of Nissan Motor Co., Ltd.
 Maria Esperanza Peralta - General Manager of Holiday Inn Managua Convention Center
 Arquimedes Gonzalez - Editor of La Prensa Magazine
 Luz Maria Sanchez -  Miss Nicaragua 1996
 Elena Salazar Barquero - Assistant Editor of FEM Magazine
 Mauricio Solorzano - Operations Manager of Compañía Licorera de Nicaragua, S.A

.

Background Music

Opening Show – Bluefields Parade
Swimsuit Competition - Alabina - Alabina (Instrumental)
Evening Gown Competition – Bond - "Gypsy Rhapsody"

.

Special Guests

 Ballet Folklórico Adela Palacios - Marimbas
 Philip Montalban - "Si, Simon...Si, Simon"
 Carlos Mejía Godoy - "Nicaragua, Nicaraguita" & "Son tus Perjumenes Mujer"

.

References

Miss Nicaragua
2004 in Nicaragua
2004 beauty pageants